CART or CarT may refer to:


Organizations
 Canada Agricultural Review Tribunal, a Canadian regulatory appellate tribunal
 Center for Advanced Research and Technology, a high school in Clovis, California
 Centre for Appropriate Rural Technology, South Africa
 Championship Auto Racing Teams, a now-defunct sanctioning body for American open-wheel car racing
 Christian African Relief Trust, a British aid organisation
 Coleshill Auxiliary Research Team, British historical research group
 Computer Analysis Response Team, a Federal Bureau of Investigation working group

Science
 Chimeric antigen receptor T cell
 Classification and regression tree, a type of decision tree
 Cocaine- and amphetamine-regulated transcript, a neuropeptide
 Combination antiretroviral therapy, a type of treatment for HIV/AIDS
 Torulene dioxygenase, an enzyme

Technology
 Communication access real-time translation, a speech-to-text conversion system

Transport
 Clermont Area Rural Transit, now Clermont Transportation Connection
 Cleveland Area Rapid Transit

Other uses
 CART, abbreviation for Churchie Art, an annual exhibition at Anglican Church Grammar School, Brisbane, Australia

See also
 Cart (disambiguation)